Prof Maurice Henri Quenouille FRSE FRSS (1924 – 12 December 1973) was a 20th-century British statistician remembered as the creator of Jackknife resampling.

Biography
The unusual surname is French in origin, meaning "distaff". The surname has transposed to Kenoly (its approximate pronunciation) in most English-speaking countries.

He was born in north London on 9 October 1924 of French ancestry. He was educated at Latymer School and St Paul's School, London. He then studied Mathematics at Jesus College, Cambridge, graduating BA around 1945. Here he had met Prof Ronald Fisher who convinced him of the importance between statistics and the objective of resolving actual rather than theoretical scientific problems. He therefore went to work at the Rothamsted Experimental Station.

In 1947 he began lecturing in Statistics at Aberdeen University. In 1949 Cambridge awarded him an MA degree.

In 1952 he was elected a Fellow of the Royal Society of Edinburgh aged only 28. His proposers were Reginald Victor Jones, William Ogilvy Kermack, David Cuthbertson and Alexander Aitken.

He obtained a further MA Degree from Oxford University in 1953 and joined the Institute of Statistics in Oxford where he stayed until 1955. In 1955 he moved to the London School of Economics as a lecturer and in 1964 to Imperial College, London. He had received a doctorate (DSc) from Cambridge in 1960. In 1965 he received the chair in Statistics at Southampton University and remained there until his premature death.

He died on holiday in Portugal on 12 December 1973 aged only 49. His position at Southampton University was filled by Prof T. M. F. Smith.

Publications
Experiments: Design and Analysis with John Aneurin

References

1924 births
1973 deaths
Mathematicians from London
Alumni of Jesus College, Cambridge
Academics of the University of Southampton
British statisticians
Fellows of the Royal Society of Edinburgh